Library of Congress Prize for American Fiction (formerly the Library of Congress Creative Achievement Award for Fiction and Library of Congress Lifetime Achievement Award for the Writing of Fiction) is an annual book award presented by the Librarian of Congress each year at the National Book Festival.

It was established in 2009 as a lifetime achievement award, although the first award was presented in 2008. In 2008, the Library of Congress was inspired to award Herman Wouk with a lifetime achievement award in the writing of fiction. That honor inspired the Library to grant subsequent fiction-writing awards, beginning with the Library of Congress Creative Achievement Award for Fiction from 2009–2012. Beginning in 2013, the award was renamed to the Library of Congress Prize for American Fiction.

Honorees

 As the Library of Congress Lifetime Achievement Award for the Writing of Fiction
 2008 Herman Wouk

 As the Library of Congress Creative Achievement Award for Fiction
 2009 John Grisham 
 2010 Isabel Allende
 2011 Toni Morrison
 2012 Philip Roth

As the Library of Congress Prize for American Fiction
2013 Don DeLillo
2014 E. L. Doctorow
2015 Louise Erdrich
2016 Marilynne Robinson
2017 Denis Johnson
 2018 Annie Proulx
 2019 Richard Ford
 2020 Colson Whitehead
 2021 Joy Williams
 2022 Jesmyn Ward

References

External links
Fiction Prize, official website

Literary awards honoring lifetime achievement
2009 establishments in the United States
Awards established in 2009
American literary awards